Michael Kingma (born 9 August 1979) is an Australian former professional basketball player.

Professional career 
Kingma was born in Manly, New South Wales, where he started his basketball playing as a junior. Kingma played seven seasons in Australia's National Basketball League, including six seasons with the Sydney Kings.  He was a member of the Kings' 2003 NBL championship team, averaging 2.8 points and 1.8 rebounds that year.

For the 2003–04 season, Kingma joined the Hunter Pirates, before leaving Australia.  He briefly played in Belgium and in Leeuwarden, Netherlands. In 2006 he moved to Sweden to play for Sundsvall Dragons.  In 2007 and 2008 he played for Borås Basket, returning to Sundsvall for the 2009–10 season.

Kingma played in the Queensland Basketball League (QBL) for the Rockhampton Rockets and the Mackay Meteors winning championships in 2010 (Rockets) and 2011 (Meteors).

For the 2010–11 season, Kingma played for British Basketball League team Glasgow Rocks. 

For the 2012–13 season, Kingma played in the Netherlands for the GasTerra Flames (also known as Donar) in the Dutch Basketball League. He had already tried out for the team in 2004. In 2013 and 2014, he played for the Rockhampton Rockets, winning championships in both years. He returned to the Rockets for the 2015 season.

National team career 
Kingma played in 25 games for the Netherlands national team, after making his debut on 20 August 2004 against Ukraine.

Acting career 
Outside of basketball, Kingma, along with fellow Australian basketballers Axel Dench, David Stiff and Julian Khazzouh, played a part in Star Wars: Episode III – Revenge of the Sith. Kingma played a Wookiee named Tarfful. The players were chosen as Wookiees for their height.

Personal 
Kingma has Dutch ancestors, which is why he holds a Dutch passport.

References

External links
Australiabasket.com profile
QBL profile

1979 births
Living people
Aris Leeuwarden players
Australian expatriate basketball people in New Zealand
Australian expatriate basketball people in the United Kingdom
Australian expatriate sportspeople in Scotland
Australian expatriate basketball people in Sweden
Australian expatriate basketball people in the Netherlands
Australian men's basketball players
Basketball players from New South Wales
Borås Basket players
Centers (basketball)
Donar (basketball club) players
Glasgow Rocks players
Hunter Pirates players
Sydney Kings players
Otago Nuggets players
People from Manly, New South Wales